The Alstom Metropolis C851E is the upcoming third generation electric multiple unit rolling stock to be introduced on the existing North East and Circle lines of Singapore's Mass Rapid Transit (MRT) system, manufactured by Alstom under Contract 851E. It consists of six North East line trains and 23 Circle line trains. The trains will be manufactured and assembled in Alstom's manufacturing facility in Barcelona, Spain and progressively shipped to Singapore from 2021 for the NEL and 2022 for the CCL. The contract, valued at S$249,854,305.00, was awarded by the Land Transport Authority during a ceremony held at Sengkang Depot. Alstom is the sole bidder for this contract. An additional 12 3-car trains will be purchased for use on the Circle line, from 2024 onwards.

Tender 
The tender for trains under the contract C851E was closed on 2 October 2017 with Alstom being the sole bidder for this contract. The LTA has shortlisted and the tender results was published.

The contract 851E was awarded to the sole bidder Alstom at a cost of $250 million on 30 April 2018.

Overview

North East Line
The first train set arrived in Singapore on 4 April 2021.

The trains draw  power from an overhead catenary. They are fully automated (ATO GoA 4) and do not require an attendant on board. Each 6-car train (Formation: DT–Mp–Mi–Mi–Mp–DT) comprises two Driving Trailer (DT) cars at each end, and four Motor Cars (Mp and Mi). The second and fifth cars of each train (Mp) are equipped with a pantograph.

Train formation
The configuration of an SBS Transit C851E in revenue service is DT–Mp–Mi+Mi–Mp–DT

The car numbers of the trains range from 7x087 to 7x098, where x depends on the carriage type. Individual cars are assigned a five-digit serial number by the rail operator SBS Transit. A complete six-car trainset consists of an identical twin set of one driving trailer (DT) and two motor cars (Mi & Mp) permanently coupled together, e.g. set 7087/7088 consists of carriages 71087, 72087, 73087, 73088, 72088 and 71088.

The first digit is always a 7.
The second digit identifies the car number, where the first car has a 1, the second has a 2 & the third has a 3.
The third digit is always a 0.
The fourth digit and fifth digit are the train identification numbers. A full length train of 6 cars have 2 different identification numbers e.g. 7087/7088 (normal coupling) or 7087/7098 (cross coupling).
 Alstom built sets 7087/7088-7097/7098.

Circle Line
The 23 new trains will supplement the existing C830 and C830C trains on the Circle Line when the 4.3km long extension from HarbourFront to Marina Bay opens in 2026. The first train set arrived in Singapore on 11 March 2022.

The trains draw 750 V DC power from a bottom-contact third rail. They are fully automated (ATO GoA 4) and do not require an attendant on board. Each 3-car train (Formation: Mc1–Tc–Mc2) comprises two Motor Cars (Mc1 and Mc2) at each end, and an unpowered Trailer Car (Tc) in the middle.

Train formation
The configuration of an SMRT C851E in revenue service is Mc1–T–Mc2

The car numbers of the trains range from 865x to 887x, where x depends on the carriage type. Individual cars are assigned a 4 digit serial number by the rail operator SMRT Trains. A complete three-car trainset consists of one trailer (T) and two driving motor (Mc) cars permanently coupled together, e.g. set 865 consists of carriages 8651, 8652, 8653.

 The first digit is always an 8.
 The second and third digits identify the set number.
 The fourth digit identifies the car number, where the first car has a 1, the second has a 2 and the third has a 3.
 Alstom built sets 865-887.

Features
To enable a more robust maintenance regime, all the new trains are equipped with condition monitoring systems to gather data from equipment on the trains. This enables continuous monitoring of the health of the equipment and allows the operator to carry out predictive maintenance for the trains. Contact shoe sensors on the new Circle Line trains enables the operator to react promptly and take necessary measures if any dislodgement is detected.

In addition, two of the new Circle Line three-car trains are each fitted with an Automatic Track Inspection (ATI) System, which enables monitoring of the running rails, track equipment and sleepers while the trains are in operation. The ATI System supplements existing track inspection activities for timely and more effective identification of rail and trackside components which require maintenance.

References

Alstom multiple units
Mass Rapid Transit (Singapore) rolling stock
750 V DC multiple units
1500 V DC multiple units
 Tender document